William Orange Forman (October 10, 1886 – October 2, 1958) was a pitcher in Major League Baseball. He played for the Washington Senators.

References

External links

1886 births
1958 deaths
Major League Baseball pitchers
Washington Senators (1901–1960) players
Baseball players from Pennsylvania
People from Crawford County, Pennsylvania